Moses Thembile Klaas is a South African politician who has been a Member of the Western Cape Provincial Parliament since 2023, representing the Economic Freedom Fighters (EFF). Klaas is the deputy provincial chairperson of the EFF in the Western Cape.

Political career
Klaas was a councillor of the Drakenstein Local Municipality, representing the Economic Freedom Fighters. At the EFF's provincial conference in October 2022, Klaas was elected as the deputy provincial chairperson of the party in the Western Cape.

In January 2023, EFF MPPs Melikhaya Xego and Nosipho Makamba-Botya vacated their seats in the Western Cape Provincial Parliament after they unsuccessfully stood for re-election at the party's provincial conference in October 2022. Klaas and EFF provincial treasurer Aishah Cassiem were selected by the party to take up the two vacant seats in the provincial parliament and both were sworn in as members of the Western Cape Provincial Parliament on 3 February 2023.

References

External links
Hon Moses Klaas at Western Cape Provincial Parliament

Living people
Year of birth missing (living people)
Xhosa people
Economic Freedom Fighters politicians
Members of the Western Cape Provincial Parliament